The 2001–02 Iraqi Elite League kicked off on 22 September 2001 and ended on 17 May 2002. Al-Talaba won their fifth league title, finishing six points ahead of Al-Quwa Al-Jawiya and eleven ahead of Al-Shorta. They also won the Iraq FA Cup that season to complete the double, and reached the final of the Iraqi Elite Cup.

League table

Results

Season statistics

Top scorers

Hat-tricks

Notes
4 Player scored 4 goals

References

External links
 Iraq Football Association

Iraqi Premier League seasons
1
Iraq